The 42nd Grand Bell Awards ceremony was held at the Sejong Center for the Performing Arts in Seoul on July 8, 2006.

Nominations and winners 
(Winners denoted in bold)

References

External links 
 

Grand Bell Awards
Grand Bell Awards
Grand Bell Awards